The Henning Bahs Award is a film award established in 2012 by the Danish Film Critics Association in collaboration with the Association of Danish Scenographers (Danish: Sammenslutningen af Danske Scenografer) in honour of the Danish screenwriter and special effects designer Henning Bahs. It is given for excellence in production design and presented at the annual Bodil Awards-ceremony.

Recipients 
 2012: Charlotte Bay Garnov and Peter Grant for A Funny Man
 2013: Niels Sejer for A Royal Affair
 2014: Rasmus Thjellesen for The Keeper of Lost Causes
 2015: Rie Lykke for Speed Walking
 2016:  for Men & Chicken (Mænd og Høns)
 2017: Jette Lehmann for Forældre
 2018: Thomas Bremer and Nikolaj Danielsen for 
 2019: Simone Grau Roney for The House That Jack Built
 2020: Josephine Farsø for 
 2021: Rie Lykke for

See also 

 Robert Award for Best Production Design

References

External links 
  

2012 establishments in Denmark
Awards established in 2012
Awards for best art direction
Henning Bahs